Gracie Gilbert (born 20 October 1992) is an Australian actress, best known for her role as Tammy Lane in the Fox8 teen drama series SLiDE, as Vicki in Lockie Leonard, as gangster Squizzy Taylor's mistress Ida Pender in Underbelly: Squizzy, and as Annie in Love Child.

Since 2018 she has worked in the field of law in Western Australia.

Early life and education
Gilbert grew up in Perth, Western Australia. She attended Mercedes College and the University of Western Australia, where she began a combined Bachelor of Arts and Bachelor of Laws degree, majoring in English and Women's Studies. She has since trained in acting at the 16th Street Actors Studio in Melbourne, Ali Robert Screen Studio in Perth, and with Tom McSweeney. In 2016 she studied producing at the Australian Film, Television and Radio School. She completed her Bachelor of Laws degree at the University of Notre Dame Australia in 2019.

Filmography

Television

Theatre

References

External links

Living people
Australian television actresses
1992 births
Actresses from Perth, Western Australia